Inauguration of Luiz Inácio Lula da Silva may refer to:

First inauguration of Luiz Inácio Lula da Silva
Second inauguration of Luiz Inácio Lula da Silva
Third inauguration of Luiz Inácio Lula da Silva